Hans Peter Ludvig Gentzel (born 12 October 1968) is a Swedish former handball player who competed in the 2000 Summer Olympics.

He was born in Gothenburg.

In 2000, he was a member of the Swedish handball team that won the silver medal in the Olympic tournament. He played all eight matches as goalkeeper. In December 2010, Gentzel ended his career and took a high ranked job within Swedish handball.

External links
profile

1968 births
Swedish male handball players
Handball players at the 2000 Summer Olympics
Olympic handball players of Sweden
Medalists at the 2000 Summer Olympics
Olympic medalists in handball
Olympic silver medalists for Sweden
Swedish expatriate sportspeople in Germany
Swedish expatriate sportspeople in Spain
Swedish people of German descent
Handball players from Gothenburg
Living people
IK Heim players
Redbergslids IK players
CB Cantabria players
BM Granollers players
HSG Nordhorn-Lingen players
THW Kiel players